The Province of 13 Spisz Towns was an autonomous administrative division of the Eldership of Spisz, that until 1568 belonged to the Kingdom of Poland, and since then to the Crown of the Kingdom of Poland, Polish–Lithuanian Commonwealth. Since 1772, it belonged to the Szepes County, Kingdom of Hungary.

The province was formed on 8 November 1412, in with the Spiš Pledge, in which Hungary had pledged part of Szepes County to the Kingdom of Poland, with the Province of 24 Szepes Towns was divided into Province of 11 Szepes Towns in Hungary, and Province of 13 Spisz Towns in Poland. In 1569, after the formation of Polish–Lithuanian Commonwealth, it became a part of Lesser Poland Province, Crown of the Kingdom of Poland. The eldership got conquered by Habsburg monarchy between 1769 and 1770 and remained under occupation until 1772 when it was formally incorporated into the Szepes County, Kingdom of Hungary. After that, it existed as the seat until 1778, when it unified with the Dominion of Lubowla, forming the Province of 16 Szepes Towns.

Subdivisions
The province had been formed from salient formed by Podoliniec District, that was connected to the rest of the Dominion of Lubowla, and via it to the rest of the Kingdom of Poland, and 5 exclaves surrounded by the Kingdom of Hungary. It was divided into 5 districts:
 Podoliniec District, with in seat exterritorially located in Podolínec, Dominion of Lubowla,
 Biała Spiska District, with the seat in Spišská Belá,
 Poprad District, with the seat in Poprad,
 Nowa Wieś Spiska District, with the seat in Spišská Nová Ves,
 Spiskie Podgrodzie District, with the seat in Spišské Podhradie, formed from the enclaves of areas of Spišské Podhradie and Spišské Vlachy.

Towns
 Spišská Nová Ves
 Spišské Vlachy
 Spišské Podhradie
 Poprad
 Veľká
 Spišská Sobota
 Stráže pod Tatrami
 Matejovce
 Spišská Belá
 Vrbov
 Ľubica
 Ruskinovce
 Tvarožná

Citations

Notes

References

Bibliography
 Zuzanna Krempaská, Sixteen Scepus Towns from 1412 to 1876. Spišska Nova Vés, Spiš Museum. ISBN 9788085173062.
 Encyklopédia Slovenska, Bratislava, 1980.
 Julia Radziszewska, Studia spiskie. Katowice. 1985.
 Terra Scepusiensis. Stan badań nad dziejami Spiszu. Lewocza-Wrocław. 2003.

Province of 13 Szepes Towns
Province of 13 Szepes Towns
Subdivisions of the Polish–Lithuanian Commonwealth
Province of 13 Szepes Towns
Province of 13 Szepes Towns
Former enclaves
Former exclaves
Province of 13 Szepes Towns
 15th-century establishments in Poland
 18th-century disestablishments in Poland
 States and territories established in 1412
 States and territories disestablished in 1778